Martin McKeay (born June 29, 1971) is a United States computer security expert and blogger who works for Akamai Technologies as a Security Evangelist. He writes one of the most popular security blogs
and also a podcast called the Network Security Podcast. He is a Qualified Security Assessor. In 2006, he started blogging for Computer World.

He was a product evangelist for StillSecure.

He has been a speaker at many conferences including Hacker Halted, RSA Conference and DEF CON. 

He is an advocate of the Payment Card Industry Data Security Standard.

References

External links 
Interview with Martin McKeay on the Southern Fried Security Podcast (episode 17)

Computer security specialists
Living people
1971 births